The Chief Justice of Nigeria or CJN is the head of the judicial arm of the government of Nigeria, and presides over the country's Supreme Court and the National Judicial Council. The current Chief Justice is Olukayode Ariwoola who was appointed on 27 June 2022. He was appointed Acting Chief Justice of the Federation upon the resignation of incumbent Chief Justice Tanko Muhammad, he was confirmed Chief Justice by the Nigerian Senate on 21 September 2022. The Supreme Court of Nigeria is the highest court in Nigeria and its decisions are final. The Chief Justice of Nigeria is nominated by the President of the Federal Republic of Nigeria upon recommendation by the National Judicial Council and is subject to confirmation by the Senate of the Federal Republic of Nigeria. The CJN holds office at the pleasure of the Nigerian constitution and can only be removed from office by death or on attainment of age 70 whichever occurs first or by impeachment by the Senate of the Federal Republic of Nigeria which requires a super majority of the members of the Nigerian Senate.

List of chief justices
Source: Federal Judicial Service Commission, Nigeria

List of previous chief justices
Lagos (1863 – 1929)
 Benjamin Way (? – 1866)
 John Carr (1866 – ) (West African Settlements Supreme Court)
 George French (1867 – 1874)
 James Marshall (1874 – 1886)
 Sir John Salman Smith (1886 – 1895)
 Sir Thomas Crossley Rayner (1895 – 1902)
 Sir William Nicholl (1902 – 1908)

Northern Nigeria
 Alastair Davidson (1900 – 1901)
 Henry Cowper Gollan (1901 – 1905)
 Sir M R Menendez (1905 – 1908)
 Sir Edwin Speed (1908 – 1913)

Southern Nigeria
 Henry Green Kelly (1900 – 1902)
 Willoughby Osborne (1906 – 1913)

References

External links
Website of the Supreme Court of Nigeria
Website of the National Judicial Council

 
Judiciary of Nigeria